This is a list of islands of the People's Republic of China (PRC). Islands that are claimed by the PRC, including those under the control of the Republic of China and those disputed with other countries, are noted after the list.

Chinese characters that mean island
The following is a list of Chinese characters (traditional and simplified) that mean 'island', preceded by the Hanyu Pinyin pronunciation in Mandarin Chinese.
Dǎo — the most generic character for island in the Chinese language 
Yǔ — mainly used around Fujian in the Min Chinese region
Shān — commonly used in the south
Shā — used in the South China Sea outlying islands or islands in rivers
Yán or Yántóu — used around Guangdong and Zhejiang
Zhì — mainly used around Zhejiang; historically written as 
Ào — often used around Zhejiang though it has mostly been replaced by 
Tuó — often used in Northern China
Táng or  — used in Zhejiang
Jī — used around Zhejiang and Shandong
Zhōu — used for many islands in rivers
Names for an archipelago/islands/island group
Qúndǎo
Lièdǎo
Dǎoqún

By provincial-level administrative divisions

Fujian
 Gulangyu Island
 Luci Island
 Meizhou Island
 Niushan Island
 Pingtan Island, Fujian
 Xiamen Island
 Xiaori Island
 Dongshan Island
 43 islands in Haidao Township
Xiyang Island, also known as Spider Island (Zhizhu Island, Chih-chu Tao) 
Fuying Island, also known as Shuangfeng Island 
the Sishuang Islands (Sishuang Liedao, Pei-shuang Lieh-tao)
 Beishuang Island (Pei-shuang) 
 Dongshuang Island (Tung-shuang) 
 Xishuang Island (Hsi-shuang) 
 Nanshuang Island (Nan-shuang) 
Xiaoxiyang Island, also known as Isthmus Island (Yisimasi Island, I-ssu-ma-ssu Tao) 
Kuishan Island (Kuishan Dao), also known as Zhuishan (Chui Shan) 
Maci Island (Ma Chick) 
Nigu Island (Nu Geu Sen)

Guangdong

 Chuanshan Archipelago
 Shangchuan Island
 Xiachuan Island
 Dachan Island
 Damang Island
 Dezhou Island
 Gaolan Island
 Hebao island
 Hengqin
 Mayu Island
 Naozhou Island
 Nei Lingding Island
 Shamian Island, Guangzhou
 Qi'ao Island
 Wanshan Archipelago
 Dawanshan Dao
Guishan Island
 Dan'gan Group
 Jiapeng Liedao
 Pengjia Group
 Southwestern Group
 Central Group
 Northwestern Group
 Xiaowanshan Dao

Guangxi
 Weizhou and Xieyang Islands
 Weizhou Island

Hainan

 Hainan (province) (the largest island under the control of the People's Republic of China; the second largest island claimed by the People's Republic of China, ranking after Taiwan which is under the control of the Republic of China)

Hunan
 Junshan Island (君山岛), an island of Dongting Lake in Junshan District, Yueyang
 Orange Isle (橘子洲), a sandy isle of the middle Xiang River in Changsha
 Ping Island (萍岛), a sandy isle of the upper Xiang River in Lingling District, Yongzhou

Hong Kong

 235 islands within Hong Kong 
 Cheung Chau
 Hong Kong Island
 Lamma Island
 Lantau Island
 Ma Wan Island
 Peng Chau
 Po Toi Island
 Tsing Yi Island

Macau

 2 islands in Macau
 Coloane
 Taipa

Shandong
 Zhifu Island

Shanghai
Changhai Islands
 Changshan Islands
 Changxing Island
 Chongming Island
 Hengsha Island
 Jiangyanansha
 Jiuduansha
 Xiasha
 Sheshan Island
 Zhongsha

Yunnan
 Islands of Erhai Lake:
 Jinsuo Island
 Nanzhao Island
 Xiaoputuo
 Yuji Island

Zhejiang
 Zhoushan Archipelago (1,390 islands)
Zhoushan Island (4th-largest)
Shengsi Islands
 Daishan Island
 Tong Island

Disputed islands

East China Sea 
 Diaoyu Islands

Fujian

The Republic of China retains control of Kinmen, Matsu and Wuqiu islands which is claimed by the People's Republic of China.
Kinmen
Matsu Island (claimed by the PRC as part of Lianjiang County)
Wuqiu

South China Sea

 Huangyan Dao
 Hupijiao Rock (reef)
 Paracel Islands
 Spratly Islands
 Suyan Rock (reef) 
 Yajiao Rock (reef)
 Zhongsha Islands
Pratas Island

Taiwan
The political status of Taiwan is a longstanding dispute. Taiwan Island and Penghu are claimed by the People's Republic of China, but are currently administered by the Republic of China, commonly known as "Taiwan".

 Taiwan
 Penghu

See also 
 Geography of China
 List of islands
 List of islands by area
 开发利用无居民海岛名录 , Names of Uninhabited Islands for Development and Usage

References

China
Islands